Kavanah, kavvanah or kavana (also pronounced /kaˈvonə/ by some Ashkenazi Jews) (כַּוָּנָה; in Biblical Hebrew kawwānā), plural kavanot or kavanos (Ashkenazim), literally means "intention" or "sincere feeling, direction of the heart". It is the mindset often described as necessary for Jewish rituals (mitzvot) and prayers. Kavanah is a theological concept in Judaism about a worshiper's state of mind and heart, his or her sincerity, devotion and emotional absorption during prayers.

In Hasidic Judaism, a Jewish tradition that emphasizes piety, kavanah is the emotional devotion, self-effaced absorption during prayers rather than a liturgical recitation driven religiosity. In esoteric Jewish mysticism (Kabbalah), kavanah refers to the practice where the devotee concentrates on the secret meanings of prayer letters and words, sometimes referring to the permutations of the divine name. Some kavanot are particular to the tradition of Kabbalah during meditation.

Kavanah has been much debated subject among Judaism scholars, with traditional sources accepting that Jewish rituals without at least minimal kavanah is insufficient. Different Jewish authorities see various levels of kavanah required for various rituals, and especially for prayer.  Some prayerbooks (siddurim) list kavanot for particular prayers.  Some particular kavanot are associated with particular holidays, for example Sukkot, Pesach, Shavuot, and others.

Discussion

Kavanah comes from an ancient verbal root also found where the object or subject is the "heart". It connotes "to direct, to prepare, to establish", an orientation of mind, heart, intention. According to Moshe Halbertal, it implies concentration and sincerity, it is not rote recitation but the very essence of a prayer where the devotee expresses a plea and supplication to God, while really believing, feeling, meaning the prayer. kavanah is both emotional and intellectual devotion, states Herman Cohen. According to the rabbinic tradition, both action and proper intention is important during a prayer, and kavanah refers to the latter. A related term in Judaism is kavanot, states Pinchas Giller, which refers to "ideas, texts and formulae" to be contemplated during praying.

Kavanah in prayer requires devotional belief and not merely reciting the words of a prayer. According to Sutnick, this implies that the worshiper understand the words of the prayer and mean it, but this can be difficult for many Jews today when they pray using liturgical Hebrew, which many Jews outside of Israel do not understand.

In Hasidism, it is one of four themes of religious worship and spiritual striving. The true faithful constantly contemplates the presence of the divine (hitbonenut), constantly cleaves and communes with the divine (devequt), intensely ecstatically feels the divine (hitlahavut), and is intently devoted to this divine (kavanah).

The kavanah is therefore the strength that the devotee uses in the intention towards God: in other words, it is a sort of concentration followed by the truthful perception of a response to faith, that is, when one is certain that God listens, precisely during the ecstatic action of the bond with God, in this realization. According to the Hasidic tales but not only, children also know how to reach a good level of kavanah and it isn't absolutely useless to teach them Shema, even before Bar mitzvah.

In Chovot HaLevavot
Chovot HaLevavot "Duties of the Heart" by Bahya ibn Paquda (section 8, chapter 3), gives 3 general categories for kavanah under the rubric "the different ways of serving God":
 duties of the heart alone (which is the subject of his book) To be humble and reverence respect to God and to love God with all your heart, all your soul and all your strength (to love God with sincere and honesty) and keep your heart, your mind your thought to regard humility, reverence respect, to have good wills, loving kindness, morality & virtues towards God and towards another:
 duties of the body and heart together, such as prayer, Torah study, praising and glorifying God, teaching wisdom, enjoining right conduct, warning against evil, and the like;
 duties of the limbs alone, in which the heart has no part except for initially directing the act to God, for example sukkah, lulav, tzitzis, mezuzah, observing Shabbos and the festivals, giving charity, and similar duties in which distraction by other thoughts does not harm the one who performs them.

Kabbalah
In Kabbalah, kavanah often refers to the permutations of the divine name that aim at overcoming the separation of the forces in the Upper World.

See also
Jewish meditation
Unifications - Yichudim
Deveikut
Shaar HaKavanot
Niyyah, a similar concept in Islam

External links
Halachipedia article

References

Jewish prayer and ritual texts
Hasidic thought
Kabbalistic words and phrases
Hebrew words and phrases in Jewish prayers and blessings